Refugees International (RI) is an independent humanitarian organization that advocates for better support for displaced people (including refugees and internally displaced people) and stateless people. It does not accept any United Nations or government funding. Refugees International's advocacy addresses resource needs and policy changes by government and UN agencies that improve conditions for refugees and displaced people. Some notable board members include Queen Noor and Matt Dillon as well as past members as George Soros, Richard Holbrooke, and Sam Waterston. The organization is based in Washington, D.C. RI also has a blog detailing its recent actions.

Mission
Refugees International advocates for lifesaving assistance and protection for displaced people and promotes solutions to displacement crises.

History
Refugees International was founded by Sue Morton in 1979 as a citizens' movement to protect Indochinese refugees. Sue Morton resided in Tokyo and Singapore in the first vital year of Refugees International. In Washington, D.C., the founding Director of Refugees International was Dianne L. Lawson, who incorporated Refugees International in the U.S. (Washington, D.C.), and oversaw of the first public actions taken by Refugees International, a full-page ad in the Washington Post, July 19, 1979, in which Refugees International requested that the Executive and Legislative Branches of the U.S. Government act to rescue Vietnamese and Cambodians (Kampucheans) at sea. On the date the ad appeared in the Washington Post, Morton and Lawson were part of a peaceful, candlelit march, led by then Senator Paul Simon (D-IL) and the singer Joan Baez, from the Lincoln Memorial to the north side of the White House. At the end of that march, the crowd sang "Amazing Grace" and, to the crowd's surprise, President Jimmy Carter strode out from the doors of the White House and announced that he had just ordered the U.S. 7th Fleet to pick up all refugees on boats who were fleeing from Southeast Asia for freedom.

Refugees International, powered by only volunteers at its beginning, grew to hire paid staff and expand its scope beyond Southeast Asia in 1990 and advocated for protection for Liberian refugees in Guinea and Kuwaitis in the Iraq-Jordan desert. Today, Refugees International conducts around 15 field missions to identify displaced people's needs for basic services such as food, water, health care, housing, access to education and protection from harm. Based on their field findings in humanitarian emergencies, they advocate to policy makers and aid agencies to improve the lives of displaced people around the world and urge the strategic benefits of a continuation of United States funding for foreign aid. The organization currently focus their work on displacement crises in and around Colombia, Democratic Republic of Congo, Mali, Myanmar, Somalia, South Sudan, and Syria.

Independence
Refugees International does not accept any government or UN funding allowing their advocates to be independent. Rather, RI leverages donations from individuals, foundations, and corporations. This enables them to speak freely, underlining policies that are working well as well as where global action falls short.

Leadership
Eric P. Schwartz, current president; previously served as United States Assistant Secretary of State for Population, Refugees, and Migration.
Michel Gabaudan, president from September 2010 until June 2017; previously served in the Office of the United Nations High Commissioner for Refugees as the Regional Representative for the United States and the Caribbean and now is the UNHCR's Regional Representative for Western Europe.
Dan Glickman, was president for only three months, from April 1, 2010, until June 2010, when he resigned; former United States Secretary of Agriculture, U.S. Representative, Chairman/CEO of the Motion Picture Association of America.
Kenneth Bacon, became president in 2001 and led the organization until he died in August 2009.
Yvette Pierpaoli, European representative, 1992-1999; killed in automobile accident in Albania in 1999.  
Lionel Rosenblatt, former Coordinator of Refugee Affairs at the U.S. Embassy in Bangkok, Thailand.  Served as President 1990-2001 and President emeritus thereafter.

References

External links

Non-profit organizations based in Washington, D.C.
Refugee aid organizations in the United States
Forced migration
Organizations established in 1979